The 2022 Big Ten Conference men's soccer season is the 127th season of college soccer play for the Big Ten Conference and part of the 2022 NCAA Division I men's soccer season. This was the Big Ten's ninth season with 14 teams. The Maryland Terrapins were the Big Ten Champions.

Previous season

Penn State were the Big Ten regular season champions, earning their first Big Ten regular season title since 2013. The Nittany Lions also completed the double by winning the 2021 Big Ten Men's Soccer Tournament, making it their first tournament title since 2005. The Nittany Lions earned the conference's automatic berth into the 2021 NCAA Division I Men's Soccer Tournament.

Besides Penn State, Big Ten runners-up and third place finishers, Maryland and Indiana, respectively, earned at-large berths into the NCAA Tournament. Penn State and Indiana earned national seeds, with Penn State earning the 12th overall seed, while Indiana earned the 15th overall seed. Maryland was eliminated in the opening round by LIU. Indiana reached the third round (Sweet Sixteen) before losing to eventual national runners-up, Washington. Penn State was eliminated by Hofstra by a record 2–8 scoreline. 

Two Big Ten players were selected with the first two picks of the 2022 MLS SuperDraft. Maryland's Ben Bender, was selected by expansion club, Charlotte FC with the first overall draft pick. Indiana goalkeeper, Roman Celentano, was selected second overall by FC Cincinnati. Additionally, Farai Mutatu, Brett St. Martin, and Daniel Bloyou were drafted.

Coaching changes 
There was one head coaching change ahead of the 2022 season. Wisconsin head coach, John Trask was relieved of his duties following the 2021 season. Wisconsin hired Loyola Chicago head coach, Neil Jones.

Coaches
Note: All stats current through the completion of the 2021 season

Preseason

Recruiting classes

Preseason Coaches polls
The preseason polls will be released in August 2022. Below are the results of the media poll with total points received next to each school and first-place votes in parentheses.

Preseason awards

All−American Teams

Preseason All Big Ten

First Team

Second Team

All Big Ten Honorable Mention (received votes from four or more members of the media): 
Indiana: 
Maryland:
Michigan:
Michigan State:
Northwestern:
Ohio State:
Penn State:
Rutgers:
Wisconsin:

Rankings

National rankings

Regional rankings - USC Midwest Region 

The United Soccer Coaches' Midwest region ranks teams across the Big Ten, Horizon, and Missouri Valley Conferences.

Awards and honors

Player of the week honors
Following each week's games, Big Ten conference officials select the player of the week.

Postseason honors 
Unanimous selections in bold.

See also 
 2022 Big Ten Conference women's soccer season

References

External links 
 Big Ten Men's Soccer

 
2022 NCAA Division I men's soccer season
2022